Jennifer Clyburn Reed is an American businesswoman and retired schoolteacher. She is the federal co-chair of the Southeast Crescent Regional Commission. Reed is a co-owner of the 49 Magnolia investment property company and chief executive officer of the Palmetto Issues Conference. She was a schoolteacher for 28 years and served as director of the center for the education and equity of African American students at the University of South Carolina.

Early life and education 
Jennifer Clyburn Reed is the middle daughter of Emily England and Rep. Jim Clyburn, the Democratic U.S. representative for  since 1993. Her older sister is Mignon Clyburn. Reed majored in political science at University of South Carolina in the 1990s. She assisted Stephen K. Benjamin's campaign for student government president.

Reed is a three-time graduate of the University of South Carolina, earning Bachelor of Arts in political science, Master of Arts in Teaching and Education Specialist in teaching degrees. She also earned a Doctor of Education degree in educational leadership from Nova Southeastern University in Fort Lauderdale, Florida.

Career

Education 
Reed taught as an elementary and middle schoolteacher for 28 years. She taught and coordinated the Advancement Via Individual Determination (AVID) colleges preparatory system at Richland County Middle School. Reed was an education specialist for the South Carolina Department of Education and worked as a school district literacy coach for the South Carolina Reading Initiative. Reed also taught English language arts. By November 2020, she had retired as an educator. Reed also helped manage her father’s campaign in 2020 earning $45,000 campaign funds.

Until her retirement in 2021, Reed was director of the center for the education and equity of African American students at the University of South Carolina.  She helped to design the Apple Core Initiative scholarship program for freshmen students at the University of South Carolina. Reed served on the selection committee for the Emily Clyburn Honors College Scholarship at the South Carolina State University.

Business and community advocacy 
Reed co-owns the investment property company 49 Magnolia Blossom. Reed and her husband rented office space to Tom Steyer's 2020 presidential campaign. She is chief executive officer of the advisory group, Palmetto Issues Conference, aimed at advocating for equitable socioeconomic policies.

In November 2020, Reed filed plans with the city of Columbia, South Carolina to renovate the Alston House. 

In August 2021, U.S. President Joe Biden nominated Reed as federal co-chair of the Southeast Crescent Regional Commission. The U.S. Senate confirmed her appointment on December 9, 2021. In this role, Reed will work on economic and poverty issues in the Southeastern United States,  along with state co-chair South Carolina Governor Henry McMaster.

Personal life 
Reed's son is Walter A Clyburn Reed.

References 

Living people
Year of birth missing (living people)
Place of birth missing (living people)
University of South Carolina alumni
University of South Carolina faculty
Schoolteachers from South Carolina
21st-century American women educators
21st-century American educators
African-American schoolteachers
21st-century African-American women
21st-century American businesswomen
21st-century American businesspeople
African-American women in business
Businesspeople from South Carolina
Clyburn family
Biden administration personnel